Erythropalaceae Planch. ex Miq.  is a family of flowering plants.  The family has been recognized by few taxonomists, the plants often being included in family Olacaceae.

The APG II system, of 2003 (unchanged from the APG system, of 1998), does not recognize this family.

References

External links
 Erythropalaceae in L. Watson and M.J. Dallwitz (1992 onwards), The families of flowering plants

Santalales
Eudicot families
Historically recognized angiosperm families